Vicente Carrillo Leyva (born 19 July 1976) is a Mexican drug lord and a leader in the Juárez Cartel.

Capture
He was arrested by Mexican police on 2 April 2009, but subsequently acquitted of money laundering charges, though charges of illegal possession of firearms kept him from gaining his freedom. After being found guilty of illegal arms possession, and paying a US$16,000 fine, he was released on 17 December 2010, to the custody of Mexican federal police with new charges of money laundering.

According to a biography published by the Mexican newspaper El Universal, his father, head and founder of the Juarez Cartel Amado Carrillo Fuentes, had told Carrillo Leyva not to enter the drug trafficking business. Consistent with this, Carrillo sent his son to study at the best private universities of México, Switzerland, and Spain. Carrillo Leyva, however, paid no attention.

See also

Drug cartels
 Gulf Cartel
 Juárez Cartel
 Sinaloa Cartel
 Tijuana Cartel
 List of Mexico's 37 most-wanted drug lords
 Mérida Initiative
 Mexican Drug War

References

Living people
Fugitives wanted by Mexico
Fugitives wanted by the United States
Juárez Cartel traffickers
Mexican money launderers
1976 births
People from Mexico City